Christopher Breen (born June 29, 1989) is a Canadian former professional ice hockey defenceman. An undrafted player, Breen originally joined the Calgary Flames organization in 2010 and made his NHL debut with the team in 2013.  He was later signed by the Boston Bruins as a free agent on July 1, 2014.

Playing career
Breen played five Ontario Hockey League (OHL) seasons between 2005 and 2010 with the Saginaw Spirit, Erie Otters and Peterborough Petes. A late-bloomer, he was not an OHL regular until his 18-year-old season and went unselected at the NHL Entry Draft. Noting his height – six feet, seven inches tall – the Calgary Flames took an interest in Breen and brought him to their American Hockey League (AHL) affiliate, the Abbotsford Heat, on a try-out when his junior season with Peterborough ended.

Though he played only one game at the end of the 2009–10 AHL season, and recorded an assist, the Flames signed him to a contract. Assigned to the Heat for the 2010–11 season, Breen played 74 games, scored four goals and seven assists, and established himself as a prospect in the Flames organization. He spent the following two seasons in Abbotsford, scoring seven points in 70 games in 2011–12 and seven points in 60 games in 2012–13. Breen missed the last 11 games of the latter campaign after suffering a shoulder injury that required surgery to repair.

While recovered from the injury, the Flames signed Breen to a one-year, two-way contract extension for 2013–14. He began the season on a conditioning assignment with Abbotsford, but was recalled to the Flames on October 21, 2013.  Breen made his NHL debut one night later in a 4–2 loss against the Phoenix Coyotes.

On July 1, 2014, Breen was signed as a free agent to a one-year two way contract with the Boston Bruins. On July 2, 2015, Breen was re-signed by the Bruins to a one-year two way contract. On July 6, 2016, Breen was re-signed by the Bruins to a one-year two way contract.

During the 2017–18 season, while in his fourth season with the Providence Bruins, Breen was signed to a one-year, two-way NHL contract with parent club, Boston on February 25, 2018. He completed the season, scoring 13 points in 62 games from the blueline.

On June 30, 2018, agreed to return for a fifth season with Providence, accepting another one-year AHL contract.

Career statistics

References
Career statistics:

External links

1989 births
Abbotsford Heat players
Calgary Flames players
Canadian ice hockey defencemen
Erie Otters players
Ice hockey people from Ontario
Living people
People from Uxbridge, Ontario
Peterborough Petes (ice hockey) players
Providence Bruins players
Saginaw Spirit players
Undrafted National Hockey League players